The 2020 season was Odd's twelfth continuous season in the Eliteserien since winning the 1. divisjon in 2008.

Season events
On 31 January, Dag-Eilev Fagermo left to become manager of Vålerenga, with Jan Frode Nornes being appointed as his replacement on 11 March 2020.

On 12 June, the Norwegian Football Federation announced that a maximum of 200 home fans would be allowed to attend the upcoming seasons matches.

On 10 September, the Norwegian Football Federation cancelled the 2020 Norwegian Cup due to the COVID-19 pandemic in Norway.

On 30 September, the Minister of Culture and Gender Equality, Abid Raja, announced that clubs would be able to have crowds of 600 at games from 12 October.

On 14 October, Odds match against Viking was postponed due to the Viking squad having to isolate after Veton Berisha tested positive for COVID-19, eventually being rearranged for 4 November.

On 28 November, Odds matches against Sandefjord on 29 November, and Strømsgodset on 2 December where postponed due to a positive COVID-19 case within the Odd squad and the whole squad having to quarantine.

Squad

Transfers

In

Loans in

Out

Released

Competitions

Eliteserien

Results summary

Results by round

Results

Table

Norwegian Cup

Squad statistics

Appearances and goals

|-
|colspan="14"|Players away from Odd on loan:
|-
|colspan="14"|''Players who left Odd during the season

|}

Goal scorers

Clean sheets

Disciplinary record

References

Odd
Odds BK seasons